The Big Horn Mountains Wilderness is a wilderness area located in central Arizona, USA, within the arid Sonora Desert. The wilderness lies midway between Phoenix and Quartzsite. Consisting of 21,000 acres, it was established by the United States Congress in 1990.

Geography and features
The area contains 9 miles of the Big Horn Mountains, which form the center core of the wilderness. The mountains are surrounded by desert plains. Activities include hiking, camping, rock climbing, photography, and nature study. Just to the northeast lies the Hummingbird Springs Wilderness.

Flora and fauna
The area is inhabited by several indigenous mammals and birds. These include bighorn sheep, gila monsters, kit foxes, desert tortoises, golden eagles, prairie falcons, barn owls and great horned owls.

See also 

List of Arizona Wilderness Areas
List of U.S. Wilderness Areas
National Wilderness Preservation System
Wilderness Act

References 

Wilderness areas of Arizona
Protected areas of Maricopa County, Arizona
Protected areas of the Sonoran Desert
Bureau of Land Management areas in Arizona